George Reese may refer to:

George Reese (basketball) (born 1977), American basketball player
George W. Reese Jr. (1923–1998), American lawyer and politician

See also
George Owen Rees (1813–1889), Welsh-Italian physician
George Rees (rugby), rugby union and rugby league footballer of the 1910s, and 1920s